Shekarabad (also Romanized as Shekarābād; also known as Shokrābād and Lashkarābād) is a village in Nurabad Rural District, in the Central District of Delfan County, Lorestan Province, Iran.

Population
At the 2006 census, its population was 247, in 57 families.

References 

Towns and villages in Delfan County